Eleanor is an unincorporated community in Butler County, in the U.S. state of Iowa.

History
A post office called Eleanor was in operation from 1901 until 1903. The community was named for Mrs. Eleanor McDonald. Eleanor's population was just 12 in 1925.

References

Unincorporated communities in Butler County, Iowa
Unincorporated communities in Iowa